Andrea Piccolo (born 23 March 2001) is an Italian professional racing cyclist, who currently rides for UCI WorldTeam .

In 2019, Piccolo won the Junior time trial at the UEC European Road Championships. Piccolo had originally signed with UCI WorldTeam  for the 2021 season but left the team at the end of May, having not raced for the team at all after health issues were detected during an early season training camp.

Major results

2018
 1st  Time trial, National Junior Road Championships
 1st Trofeo Emilio Paganessi
 2nd Overall Trophée Centre Morbihan
1st  Mountains classification
 3rd  Time trial, UCI Junior Road World Championships
 4th Overall GP Général Patton
 4th Trofeo Citta di Loano
2019
 UEC European Junior Road Championships
1st  Time trial
3rd  Road race
 National Junior Road Championships
1st  Time trial
2nd Road race
 1st  Overall Giro della Lunigiana
 3rd Overall Course de la Paix Juniors
 6th Time trial, UCI Junior Road World Championships
 6th Trofeo Emilio Paganessi
 7th Gent–Wevelgem Juniors
2020
 2nd Time trial, National Under-23 Road Championships
2021
 1st Ruota d'Oro
 2nd GP Capodarco
 8th Piccolo Giro di Lombardia
 9th Veneto Classic
2022
 2nd Circuito de Getxo
 2nd Japan Cup
 3rd Coppa Agostoni
 4th Road race, National Road Championships
 5th Maryland Cycling Classic
 7th Prueba Villafranca de Ordizia
 10th Bretagne Classic
 10th Coppa Sabatini

References

External links

2001 births
Living people
Italian male cyclists
Cyclists from the Metropolitan City of Milan
People from Magenta, Lombardy